Jean-Baptiste Loeillet of London (18 November 1680 – 19 July 1730), was a Flemish baroque composer as well as a performer on the recorder, flute, oboe, and harpsichord.  He is called the London Loeillet to distinguish him from another famous composer, his first cousin Jean Baptiste Loeillet of Ghent, and he was the elder brother of Jacques Loeillet, also a composer.

Loeillet was born at Ghent, then in the Spanish Netherlands.  In 1705, after his studies in Ghent and Paris, he moved to London and became known as John.  In London, his last name was sometimes rendered as 'Lully' or 'Lullie': he was unrelated to the Jean-Baptiste Lully, the Italian-born French composer. His works were published by John Walsh in London under the name of John Loeillet.

He was successful as a player and teacher of the harpsichord. He played woodwind in the Queen's Theatre in the Haymarket and held musical gatherings every week at his home. His performances were well received in London; and he was responsible for introducing Arcangelo Corelli's 12 concerti grossi to Londoners.  According to the New Penguin Dictionary of Music, he helped to popularise the transverse flute (a new instrument compared to the recorder) in England.  He died in London.

Leopold Godowsky's piano suite Renaissance features an arrangement of one of the Loeillet's Gigues.

Major compositions
Twelve Sonatas for Recorders and Continuo
Six Suites of Lessons for the Harpsichord (London: John Walsh, n.d.[1723])
Sonata in D Major
Sonata in E minor for Recorder and Continuo
Loeillet, John. XII SONATAS in three Parts / Six of which are for two VIOLINS and a BASS / three for two GERMAN FLUTES and three for a HAUTBOY & common FLUTE with a BASS for the VIOLONCELLO and a Thorough BASS for the HARPSICHORD. Opera Secunda. London, Walsh, n/d.
Sonate in C Major

Notes
 Frans Brüggen, notes from Sonata in F Major, Hargail Music Press, (1963).

Recording
Loeillet. Sonatas & Triosonatas, La Caccia directed by Patrick Denecker, 2006, MF8007. Contains recordings of sonatas by Jean-Baptiste Loeillet de Gant, Jean-Baptiste Loeillet de Londres and Jacques Loeillet.

External links
 

1680 births
1730 deaths
English classical composers
English Baroque composers
English people of Belgian descent
English people of Flemish descent
Musicians from Ghent
Members of the Academy of Ancient Music
18th-century classical composers
18th-century British male musicians
English male classical composers